Lego Elves was a Lego product line produced by The Lego Group that was launched in 2015. It was accompanied by the Lego Elves animated television series and webisode series that began with a mini-movie titled Unite The Magic, which was released on the Lego YouTube channel, and on Netflix. The product line was based on the storyline of the animated series, which follows the adventures of a character named Emily Jones who travels to a magical land called Elvendale. The theme aimed to introduce a fantasy element to girl-focused Lego products. It was eventually discontinued by 2019.

Overview 
The Lego Elves theme was underpinned by the storyline of its accompanying animated television series titled Lego Elves and Lego Elves: Secrets of Elvendale. Both the Lego toy line and the animated series targeted the girls market. The series focuses on a human girl named Emily Jones, who inherits a magical amulet from her grandmother and travels through a portal to a magical realm called Elvendale. The storyline relates how she meets four elves with elemental powers (fire, earth, air and water) who help her to return home.

Development 
Following the success of Lego Friends and Lego Disney Princess, The Lego Group aimed to launch another Lego theme targeted at the girls market. In contrast to the contemporary setting of Lego Friends, Lego Elves aimed to introduce a fantasy setting into girl-focused Lego toys. The theme was developed after testing several story ideas with girls around the world.

Launch 
The Lego Elves theme was announced on 12 February 2015 at the American International Toy Fair. The toy line began with the release of eight toy construction sets that introduced the main elves and their home environments and these began to launch in March 2015. An official teaser for the animated series was released on the Lego YouTube channel on 15 December 2014. This was followed by the release of a trailer on 19 February 2015.

Characters

Main 
 Emily Jones (voiced by Ashleigh Ball) is the protagonist, a resourceful, modest, amicable, and affectionate human girl, whose "element" is "love".
 Azari Firedancer (voiced by Erin Mathews) is a fire elf who is spontaneous, extroverted, loud, sometimes reckless, and usually cheerful.
 Farran Leafshade (voiced by Kyle Rideout) is an earth elf who is honest, loyal, reliable, and slightly self-important and has a crush on Aira.
 Aira Windwhistler (voiced by Ashleigh Ball) is a wind elf who is good-natured, excitable, light-hearted and whose favourite pastime is the construction of machines.
Naida Riverheart (voiced by Erin Mathews) is a water elf who is patient, modest, slightly shy, but courageous.

Humans
 Sophie Jones (voiced by Rebecca Husain) is Emily's younger sister who is captured by the Goblin King as bait to lure Emily to him.
 Mrs. Jones (voiced by Ashleigh Ball) is Emily and Sophie's mother.
 Mr. Jones is Emily's father.

Elves
 Skyra (voiced by Ashleigh Ball) is a wind elf and formal guardian of the portal between Elvendale and the human world. One of the five sisters, she is often imperious and scornful, but lenient toward Emily, her sister's granddaughter. She makes Emily guardian of the portal in Unite the Magic.
 Johnny Baker (voiced by Kyle Rideout) is a fire elf and a pastry chef located in the lava fields of Elvendale.
 Sira Copperbranch (voiced by Racquel Belmonte) is an earth elf who runs the Starlight Inn, Sky Captain of Elvendale, and friends with Tidus Stormsurfer. Not a typical earth elf, she loves flying and has her own airship.
 Tidus Stormsurfer (voiced by Vincent Tong) is a water elf who runs Elvendale's School of Dragons as the dragon trainer.
 Ragana Shadowflame (voiced by Heather Doerksen) is a fire elf and the main antagonist. Having weak powers, she drinks from the Shadow Fountain to gain power and becomes evil. She has a pet cat named Jynx.
 Cronan Darkroot / Goblin King (voiced by Riley Murdock) is an earth elf. After losing his mother to the dark power of her amulet, he vows to bring her back by stealing Emily's amulet, which will allow him to open a portal to Earth. He is known as the Goblin King, and is also Emily and Sophie's first cousin once removed, due to his mother, Quartzine, being one of the five sisters.
 Rosalyn Nightshade (voiced by Nicole Oliver) is a healer elf (she is a water elf)  and former queen of the forest, who is tricked by Cronan Darkroot and overthrown. She has some of the most powerful potions in Elvendale.
 Lumia (voiced by Rhona Rees) is a light elf and a shape-shifter who can transform into a variety of animals.
 Noctura (voiced by Erin Mathews) is a dark elf who is a bat-themed shape-shifter and has a number of bat minions who aid in her wicked schemes.

Toy line
According to Bricklink The Lego Group released 42 toy construction sets for the Lego Elves theme between 2015 and 2018. The product line was eventually discontinued by 2019.

2015 sets 
In March 2015, eight playsets were announced for the 2015 spring wave, including Aira's Creative Workshop, Naida's Spa Secret, Naida's Epic Adventure Ship, Azari and the Magical Bakery, The Elves' Treetop Hideaway, Farran and the Crystal Hollow, Aira's Pegasus Sleigh and Skyra's Mysterious Sky Castle. In addition, Azari's Magic Fire polybag set was released as a promotion.

2016 sets 
In March 2016, ten playsets were announced for the 2016 summer wave, including Emily Jones and the Baby Wind Dragon, The Water Dragon Adventure, Elvendale School of Dragons, The Starlight Inn, Fire Dragon's Lava Cave, The Secret Market Place, The Precious Crystal Mine, The Dragon Sanctuary, Queen Dragon's Rescue and Ragana's Magic Shadow Castle. In addition, Sira's Adventurous Airglider polybag set was released as a promotion.

2017 sets 
The Lego Elves summer 2017 playsets were revealed at New York Toy Fair and included Azari and The Goblin Forest Escape, Rosalyn's Healing Hideout and Breakout from the Goblin King's Fortress.

2018 sets 
Five playsets were launched in January 2018 as part of the 2018 Lego Elves wave, which included Emily Jones and The Eagle Getaway, Naida and The Water Turtle Ambush, and Noctura's Tower and the Earth Fox Rescue.

Animated series

Lego Elves (2015)

An animated television series, Lego Elves, was produced by Ja Film in Aarhus, Denmark. In the United States, the first episode titled Unite The Magic was first shown on 8 March 2015 on Disney Channel. The second special titled Dragons To Save Time To Be Brave was shown on March 6, 2016, as a two-part special on Disney Channel. A sequel to Dragons to Save Time to be Brave, titled Down a Dark Path was shown on August 14, 2016, on Disney Channel.

Episodes

Critical reception 
Jenny Nixon for Common Sense Media gave the series a three-star rating, commenting, "This series is jam-packed with little girl bait - sparkling rainbow oceans, a flowing-haired Pegasus or three - and though the plot has a similar amount of depth, there's still something kind of fun about it. The quests Emily and her elf friends go on can be a tad generic, sure, but it's always nice to see a show with a high percentage of female characters, most of whom jump right in on the action and don't need a boy (or boy elf) to lead the way."

Lego Elves - Webisodes (2015-2017) 
The Lego Elves webisodes were released on the Lego YouTube channel and later combined into episode compilations. Episodes compilation 1-8 was released on 30 April 2018. Episodes compilation 9-17 was released on 7 May 2018. Episodes compilation 18-25 was released on 14 May 2018. Episodes compilation 26-33 was released on 21 May 2018.

Lego Elves: Secrets of Elvendale (2017) 
Lego Elves: Secrets of Elvendale, a Netflix series produced by Studio Mir and animated by Production Reve, was released on September 1, 2017.

Episodes

Critical reception 
Joyce Slaton for Common Sense Media gave the series a three-star rating and commented on the "beautiful visuals, charming characters, heavy commercialism". The review also opined, "It's certainly lovely to look at -- the typical blocky Lego style has been abandoned for a rainbow-hued and glitter palette - and it goes down smoothly enough for young viewers who like mild antics lightened up with lots of jokes and friendly repartee between characters."

Other media

Characters spots 
Several short character spots were released on the Lego YouTube channel to promote the Lego Elves series. Meet Aira, Meet Emily Jones, Meet Farran and Meet Naida were released on 22 January 2015. LEGO Elves - Azari was released on 11 March 2015. Introducing Tidus and Sira, Emily the Elves and the Dragons and The Baby Dragons were released on 9 February 2016. Ragana, Jynx and Dusti and Emily and the Queen Dragon were released on 4 March 2016.

Publications 
A quarterly Lego Elves magazine targeted at girls and published by Immediate Media was launched from 2015 to accompany the toy line.

Games 
An app game titled Lego Elves - Unite The Magic was developed by The Lego Group for iOS and released on 1 March 2015.

Reception 
In September 2015, The Lego Group reported that the Lego Elves line and Lego Jurassic World, "were received very positively by children all over the world", and that these themes had helped to push revenue up by 23%.

See also 

 Lego Friends
 Lego Disney
 Lego DC Superhero Girls
 Lego Unikitty!

References

Bibliography 
 Lego Elves: A Magical Adventure. Authored by Ameet Studio. Published by Scholastic Inc, 2015. 
 LEGO ELVES DRAGON QUEEN. Authored by Stacia Deutsch. Published by Scholastic US, 2016. 
 LEGO ELVES: Quest for the Keys. Authored by Stacia Deutsch. Published by Scholastic Inc, 2016. 
 LEGO ELVES DRAGON ADVENTURES. Authored by Ameet Studio. Published by Scholastic US, 2016. 
 LEGO Elves: To the Rescue!. Authored by Ladybird. Published by Penguin Random House Children's UK, 2016. 
 LEGO Elves: A Magical Journey. Published by Penguin Random House Children's UK, 2016.

External links
 

Elves
Products introduced in 2015
Elves
Elves in popular culture
Products and services discontinued in 2019
Television series by Studio Mir